Zdzisław Janik (born 11 November 1964) is a Polish retired footballer who is last known to have played as a midfielder for .

Career

Janik started his career with Polish second division side Wisła Kraków. After that, he signed for Wawel Kraków in the Polish third division. In 1989, Janik returned to Polish top flight club Wisła Kraków, where he made 116 league appearances and scored 21 goals.  In 1993, Janik signed for Oostende in the Belgian top flight after receiving interest from Belgian top flight team Anderlecht, where he suffered a knee injury. In 1995, he signed for Beerschot in the Belgian second division but left due to them going bankrupt.

In 1997, Janik signed for Polish second division outfit Wawel Kraków. In 1999, he signed for Cracovia in the Polish third division. Before the 2001 season, Janik signed for Faroese side GÍ, where he said, "A lot of foreigners play here, most Yugoslavs and Brazilians. Teams prefer the English style, a lot of running, fighting, body games. We have a guaranteed job in a fish factory. Marek and I both stand for 8 hours at the tape. Then we go to training." In 2004, he signed for Błękitni Modlnica in the Polish seventh division. In 2006, Janik signed for Polish sixth division club .

References

External links
 
 

Polish footballers
Poland international footballers
Expatriate footballers in the Faroe Islands
Polish expatriate sportspeople in Belgium
Polish expatriate footballers
Association football midfielders
1964 births
Footballers from Kraków
Ekstraklasa players
Belgian Pro League players
Faroe Islands Premier League players
Wisła Kraków players
K.V. Oostende players
Wawel Kraków players
Garbarnia Kraków players
MKS Cracovia (football) players
K Beerschot VA players
GÍ Gøta players
Living people
Expatriate footballers in Belgium